Shanghai Xiaoi Robot Technology Co. Ltd or Xiao-i is a Chinese artificial intelligence company founded in 2001 by Max Yuan and Pinpin Zhu. It develops AI technologies and industry applications specializing in data domain and Natural Language Processing.

The company is headquartered in Shanghai and has branches, research facilities and "AI+" experience centers in Beijing, Guangzhou, Guizhou, Hong Kong, Nanjing and Shenzhen to provide conversational AI applications and data solutions. In 2018, Xiao-i opened its Asia-Pacific headquarters in Hong Kong.

History
Xiao-i was founded in 2001 in Shanghai and debuted its first chatbot in 2004 over Microsoft Network’s (MSN) messaging platform. Xiao-i’s first development phase focused on natural language processing(NLP) with the aim of enhancing the customer experience with AI technology and applications. In 2006 the company offered their chatbot with specific company related knowledge in addition to weather reports and stock market data. 
In 2008, Xiao-i began to collaborate with its first corporate client Jiangsu Mobile to develop an intelligent customer service robot that provided service to the telecommunications company’s customers through its website and addressed customer queries over mobile phone text messaging. The chatbot greatly helped to reduce Jiangsu Mobile’s labor costs. Xiao-i currently supports China’s three mobile carriers with its AI technology and applications. Xiao-i entered its second development phase in 2011. During 2012-2014, Xiao-i grew its client base in the banking sector, for example it launched a virtual customer assistant (VCA) for China Merchants Bank and China Construction Bank in 2012. Xiao-i also rolled out solutions for Smart TV, Smart Homes, Smart Appliances and Smart Automobiles, serving clients such as Samsung, Haier and LG
During 2015-2016, Xiao-i released its proprietary Cloud Platform that powers AI systems and enables them to make prompt and accurate decisions. Later, Xiao-i upgraded this platform and launched intelligent robotic operating system iBot OS. 
To expand its international presence, Xiao-i established its research and development center in Hong Kong in 2017, followed by the opening of its Asia-Pacific headquarters in the same city in 2018. Hong Kong Chief Executive Ms. Carrie Lam officiated the opening ceremony.

In August 2020, Xiao-i filed a $1.4 billion lawsuit against Apple Inc. on allegations of patent infringement. The company argued that Apple's Siri infringes on a patent granted to the company in 2009.

References 

Companies based in Shanghai
Chinese companies established in 2001
AI companies
Computer companies of China